In geometry, the nonconvex great rhombicosidodecahedron is a nonconvex uniform polyhedron, indexed as U67. It has 62 faces (20 triangles, 30 squares and 12 pentagrams), 120 edges, and 60 vertices. It is also called the quasirhombicosidodecahedron. It is given a Schläfli symbol rr{,3}.  Its vertex figure is a crossed quadrilateral.

This model shares the name with the convex great rhombicosidodecahedron, also known as the truncated icosidodecahedron.

Cartesian coordinates 
Cartesian coordinates for the vertices of a nonconvex great rhombicosidodecahedron are all the even permutations of

 (±1/τ2, 0, ±(2−1/τ))
 (±1, ±1/τ3, ±1)
 (±1/τ, ±1/τ2, ±2/τ)

where τ = (1+)/2 is the golden ratio (sometimes written φ).

Related polyhedra 

It shares its vertex arrangement with the truncated great dodecahedron, and with the uniform compounds of 6 or 12 pentagonal prisms. It additionally shares its edge arrangement with the great dodecicosidodecahedron (having the triangular and pentagrammic faces in common), and the great rhombidodecahedron (having the square faces in common).

Great deltoidal hexecontahedron 

The great deltoidal hexecontahedron is a nonconvex isohedral polyhedron. It is the dual of the nonconvex great rhombicosidodecahedron. It is visually identical to the great rhombidodecacron. It has 60 intersecting cross quadrilateral faces, 120 edges, and 62 vertices.

It is also called a great strombic hexecontahedron.

See also 
 List of uniform polyhedra

References

External links 
 
 
 Uniform polyhedra and duals

Uniform polyhedra